Roger "Buzz" Osborne (born March 25, 1964), also known as King Buzzo, is an American guitarist, vocalist and songwriter. He is a founding member of the rock band Melvins, as well as Fantômas and Venomous Concept.

Biography
Born in Morton, Washington, Osborne is of English, Italian and Jewish descent. He moved to Montesano, Washington at the age of 12. He first started listening to the music of Aerosmith and Ted Nugent, then became greatly interested in punk rock after a few years. In the early 1980s, Osborne founded the Melvins with Matt Lukin and Mike Dillard who all attended Montesano High School (Wheeler Building) where he graduated in 1982. The Melvins began playing fast hardcore punk after Osborne was introduced to bands such as Black Flag, Flipper, and MDC by a friend. When Dillard left the band in 1984, Dale Crover was recruited, and the band's rehearsals moved to a back room of Crover's parents' house in Aberdeen, Washington. They began to play slower and "heavier" songs.

In 1986, the band released their Six Songs EP on C/Z Records (later re-released as Eight Songs, 10 Songs and as 26 Songs in 2003 on Ipecac Recordings) that was recorded live to a two-track. In October 1986, they recorded their first full album, Gluey Porch Treatments, at Studio D in Sausalito, California, which was released in 1987 on Alchemy Records (and later re-released as a bonus on the CD version of their second album Ozma on Boner Records and in 1999 on Ipecac Recordings with some garage demos).

In 1988, Osborne, with Crover, relocated to San Francisco, California where the band recorded their next album, Ozma, in May 1989. It was released later that year.

Osborne, along with the rest of the Melvins, knew the members of Nirvana. When Dave Grohl's previous band, Scream, disbanded, he approached Osborne for advice. Osborne, in response, introduced Grohl to Kurt Cobain and Krist Novoselic.

In 1997, Osborne appeared in the promo video for The Offspring's video "All I Want", as a masked pianist. Osborne also appears in the 1994 video for the Beck song "Beercan" which samples the Melvins' song "Hog Leg".

Osborne joined Tool onstage during their tour for Ænima. The Melvins also opened for Tool on the tour. In 1998, Osborne joined a new band known as Fantômas with Faith No More vocalist Mike Patton, a band which he remains involved with to the present day.

Fantômas' latest studio album release is 2005's Suspended Animation. A concept album, it focused on the theme of holidays and featured a frenetic punk rock sound. The album was a commercial success and reached the No. 7 spot on Billboards Top Heatseekers chart and No. 12 on its Top Independent Albums chart.

In 2014, Osborne announced his first solo acoustic tour along with a 10" EP entitled This Machine Kills Artists and an album to follow in June on Ipecac Recordings.

Osborne makes a cameo appearance in the 2014 video game Sunset Overdrive as himself and performs a song for the soundtrack.

In 2017, he played as part of Crystal Fairy with Teri Gender Bender, Dale Crover and Omar Rodríguez-López. In that same year, he also co-produced the full length album Orenda by rock band With Our Arms to the Sun.

Influences

Osborne has remarked, "From a very early age I was interested in underground music. I never appreciated the big stadium shows in the first place—I cut my milk teeth musically on smaller shows. A much more intimate basis. That's the lessons I learned from punk rock that I never forgot. That extends to today." As referred to before, he had a very wide set of musical influences since his childhood, ranging from arena rock to glam rock to punk to power pop and more. Osborne has called himself a lifelong "musical anthropologist" and stated that "since I never grew up around people who gave me any indication of how one was supposed to act, I was equally excited seeing the Kinks as I would be by seeing a punk rock band. Or Cheap Trick." In terms of hip hop music, he has stated that his favorite rap album is Run-D.M.C.'s Raising Hell.

Legacy and praise

From their earlier slow metal style, the Melvins have been attributed with providing the framework for what would become the grunge, sludge metal and drone doom genres. Buzz Osborne's seminal influence on grunge have sometimes led him (and his band) to be dubbed as the "Godfather of Grunge".

Labelled as an "icon of the alt-metal world", Osborne has been named a key influence by guitarists such as Kurt Cobain (Nirvana), Adam Jones (Tool), Dave Grohl (Foo Fighters), Kim Thayil (Soundgarden), Brent Hinds and Bill Kelliher (Mastodon), Matt Pike (Sleep), Greg Anderson and Stephen O'Malley (Sunn O), Jimmy Bower (Eyehategod), Hank Williams III and Nate Garrett (Spirit Adrift). Adam Jones said that Osborne possesses the two most important qualities for any guitarist, i.e. "attitude and discipline", and compared his artistry with King Crimson founder Robert Fripp. Jones added: "Where I do more of a shoe-gazer thing onstage, Buzz will microwave a crowd." Scott Kelly of Neurosis stated that Osborne's non-cyclical approach to riffs was a massive influence on his band, wherein he plays a section once or at most twice in a song without repeating it again. Kim Thayil cited that same aspect as highly inspirational, in addition to Osborne's drop D tuning and slower compositions. Dylan Carlson, leader of the drone metal band Earth, has constantly cited Osborne's personal advice as a guide for his career path. The bands Earth and Sunn O))), which were heavily influenced by Melvins' slower pieces, based their amplifier choices on those of Osborne, as did Clutch as well.

After Corrosion of Conformity original singer Mike Dean left the band in 1987, they contacted Osborne to join in.

Emma Ruth Rundle called him "a worthy hero in all regards and a very genuine man."

Reaction to grunge's influence
Although the Melvins had a massive influence on the "Seattle sound", Osborne has constantly expressed negativity toward that scene. He has denounced what he calls the romanticization of it, which he instead describes as a "horrendous nightmare"; Osborne was a childhood friend of Kurt Cobain and remained close to Chris Cornell of Soundgarden until both singers committed suicide following their struggles with drug addiction. At the time, Osborne and his Melvins bandmates also used drugs, including toluene, but by 2014 he had been around twenty years sober. In a 2018 interview, asked if his feelings about that period changed after the deaths of Cobain and Cornell, Osborne replied:

Personal life and beliefs

Osborne has been married to graphic designer Mackie Osborne since 1993. They are dog owners, having kept several rescued dogs. The couple decided not to have children. Osborne does not believe rock musicians should make political statements and that people "should look for higher sources than entertainers for their political beliefs".
He is an avid golf fan and player.

Osborne does not drink or use other recreational drugs.

Political and social views
In a 2011 interview with the music magazine L.A. Record, Osborne stated when asked about American politics that "I hate conservatives, but I really hate liberals. Here's the thing. I have my own opinions about everything, and it's basically classic liberalism." In 2008, he told the magazine Alarm that he opposes what he sees as both modern socialist and fascist thought, stating that he's "into true liberalism, which means you mind your own goddamn business; you take care of yourself." In a 2014 interview with Tonedeaf, Osborne expressed that American economist Thomas Sowell has been a major influence on his career. "I consider Sowell the greatest philosopher of all time." Osborne explained. "He is a PhD economist and he's written more than 30 books about everything you can imagine, from social commentary to how economics works."

In a 2008 interview with City Newspaper of Rochester, when asked about his collaboration with Jello Biafra on two albums, Osborne stated that "I don't relate at all to his politics. I believe in personal freedom, personal responsibility. And nobody tells you what to do more than the left wing. They're a bunch of fascists."

In terms of issues covering copyright and illegal file-sharing of songs, Osborne's remarked, "The internet downloading—people need to get over it". He's also added, "Is it stealing? Sure, yeah—but it doesn't matter. It's over. Things have changed. We have to move on." In an earlier interview, he argued, "For me musically, I wish I woulda had something like YouTube when I was a kid so I could go, 'Oh, what's this Captain Beefheart?'"

Musical equipment
Osborne primarily used Gibson Les Paul guitars from the 1960s and 1970s played through Boss effect pedals and variety of vintage amplifiers and cabinets.

Discography

References

External links

 
 
 

1964 births
Living people
American heavy metal guitarists
American male singers
American libertarians
Grunge musicians
American punk rock guitarists
American punk rock singers
Jewish American musicians
Jewish heavy metal musicians
Lead guitarists
Childfree
Singers from Washington (state)
Songwriters from Washington (state)
Alternative metal guitarists
Alternative metal musicians
Guitarists from Washington (state)
American male guitarists
Melvins members
Fantômas (band) members
20th-century American guitarists
People from Montesano, Washington
People from Morton, Washington
20th-century American male musicians
Crystal Fairy (band) members
American people of Italian descent
21st-century American Jews
American male songwriters
Jews in punk rock
American people of English descent